Viverroidea is a clade within feliformia, containing both the family Viverridae, and the superfamily Herpestoidea.

Classification
 Infraorder Viverroidea
 Family Viverridae (civets and allies)
 Superfamily Herpestoidea
 Family Eupleridae (Malagasy carnivorans)
 Family Herpestidae (mongooses and allies)
 Family Hyaenidae (hyenas and aardwolf)
 Family †Lophocyonidae
 Family †Percrocutidae

Phylogenetic tree
The phylogenetic relationships of Viverroidea are shown in the following cladogram:

References

Mammal infraorders
Mammal taxonomy
Taxa named by John Edward Gray